Salvatore Fanni (born July 10, 1964) is an Italian former professional boxer who competed from 1988 to 2003. He held the European flyweight title from February 1991 to November 1992, and unsuccessfully challenged for the WBO flyweight title twice, as well as the WBO light flyweight title once.

Professional boxing career
Fanni made his professional debut on April 10, 1988, beating Tunisian fighter Mohamed ben Ali Saidi in Iglesias. After winning his first 16 fights, he received a shot at the vacant European flyweight title on August 3, 1990, facing Scottish fighter (and future world champion) Pat Clinton in Cagliari. Clinton defeated the Italian by majority decision in what he later called the best performance of his career, saying he was "at the top of [his] game" at the time.

Less than seven months later, he fought Joe Kelly for the same title (again in Cagliari), stopping him inside a minute in the second round, thus becoming the first Italian to hold the European flyweight belt since Franco Cherchi six years earlier. He successfully defended his title in his next four fights, against Danny Porter, James Drummond, Porter and Michele Poddighe, respectfully. Fanni finally lost his belt on November 14, 1992, when Welsh fighter Robbie Regan defeated him by unanimous decision in Cardiff. Regan, a future WBO bantamweight champion himself, called Fanni "one of the best [he ever] fought but... also a true sportsman."

Between 1993 and 1995, Fanni unsuccessfully challenged compatriot Luigi Camputaro for the European flyweight belt on three separate occasions, losing twice and achieving a draw. On May 31, 1996, in what was only his second fight outside of Italy, Fanni challenged Danish fighter Jesper Jensen for the vacant European flyweight belt in Copenhagen. He lost the bout by unanimous decision after 12 rounds. Jensen later ranked his victory over Fanni as one of his greatest achievements. Three months later, Fanni defeated Michele Poddighe, winning the vacant Italian flyweight title, although he never defended it.

By the end of 1996, Fanni had compiled a respectable record of 30-5-2. He finally received his first (of three) world title shots on July 19, 1997, when he matched up against Carlos Gabriel Salazar for his WBO flyweight title in the Italian hamlet of Porto Rotondo. He lost to the Argentine by unanimous decision. His next shot came just over a year later, when he faced Mexican fighter Rubén Sánchez León for the same title in Cagliari. He came away empty-handed though, as he lost to Sánchez León in the same fashion: 12-round UD.

His final world title fight came on April 17, 1999, when he moved down a weight class to challenge 20-year-old Mexican starlet Jorge Arce for his WBO light flyweight belt in Sassari. Arce defeated Fanni by TKO in the sixth round; it was the first and only time Fanni was ever stopped in his career. He received one last shot at the European flyweight title on December 3, 1999, losing to Russian fighter Alexander Makhmutov in Milan. He retired after the bout.

Fanni made his return to the ring more than three years later. He faced Mercurio Ciaramitaro in Aversa on May 31, 2003, two months before his 40th birthday, when his boxing license would be rescinded. In what turned out to be his final fight, Fanni defeated Ciaramitaro by DQ in the fourth round. He finished with a record of 33-9-2.

Professional boxing record

| style="text-align:center;" colspan="8"|33 Wins (17 knockouts, 16 decisions),  9 Losses (1 knockouts, 8 decisions), 2 Draws
|-  style="text-align:center; background:#e3e3e3;"
|  style="border-style:none none solid solid; "|Res.
|  style="border-style:none none solid solid; "|Record
|  style="border-style:none none solid solid; "|Opponent
|  style="border-style:none none solid solid; "|Type
|  style="border-style:none none solid solid; "|Rd., Time
|  style="border-style:none none solid solid; "|Date
|  style="border-style:none none solid solid; "|Location
|  style="border-style:none none solid solid; "|Notes
|- align=center
|Win
|align=center|33–9–2||align=left| Mercurio Ciaramitaro
|
|
|
|align=left|
|align=left|
|- align=center
|Loss
|align=center|32–9–2||align=left| Alexander Makhmutov
|
|
|
|align=left|
|align=left|
|- align=center
|Loss
|align=center|32–8–2||align=left| Jorge Arce
|
|
|
|align=left|
|align=left|
|- align=center
|Loss
|align=center|32–7–2||align=left| Rubén Sánchez León
|
|
|
|align=left|
|align=left|
|- align=center
|Win
|align=center|32–6–2||align=left| Bela Sandor
|
|
|
|align=left|
|align=left|
|- align=center
|Win
|align=center|31–6–2||align=left| Gheorghe Ghiompirica
|
|
|
|align=left|
|align=left|
|- align=center
|Loss
|align=center|30–6–2||align=left| Carlos Gabriel Salazar
|
|
|
|align=left|
|align=left|
|- align=center
|Win
|align=center|30–5–2||align=left| Gabriel Pedro Silva Guerra
|
|
|
|align=left|
|align=left|
|- align=center
|Win
|align=center|29–5–2||align=left| Michele Poddighe
|
|
|
|align=left|
|align=left|
|- align=center
|Loss
|align=center|28–5–2||align=left| Jesper Jensen
|
|
|
|align=left|
|align=left|
|- align=center
|Win
|align=center|28–4–2||align=left| Michele Poddighe
|
|
|
|align=left|
|align=left|
|- align=center
|Win
|align=center|27–4–2||align=left| Michele Poddighe
|
|
|
|align=left|
|align=left|
|- align=center
|Loss
|align=center|26–4–2||align=left| Luigi Camputaro
|
|
|
|align=left|
|align=left|
|- align=center
|Draw
|align=center|26–3–2||align=left| Luigi Camputaro
|
|
|
|align=left|
|align=left|
|- align=center
|Win
|align=center|26–3–1||align=left| Julian Gomez
|
|
|
|align=left|
|align=left|
|- align=center
|Win
|align=center|25–3–1||align=left| Jose Ramon Soto
|
|
|
|align=left|
|align=left|
|- align=center
|Win
|align=center|24–3–1||align=left| Silverio Porras
|
|
|
|align=left|
|align=left|
|- align=center
|Loss
|align=center|23–3–1||align=left| Luigi Camputaro
|
|
|
|align=left|
|align=left|
|- align=center
|Loss
|align=center|23–2–1||align=left| Robbie Regan
|
|
|
|align=left|
|align=left|
|- align=center
|Win
|align=center|23–1–1||align=left| Mario Alberto Cruz Alfaro
|
|
|
|align=left|
|align=left|
|- align=center
|Win
|align=center|22–1–1||align=left| Juan Pablo Salazar
|
|
|
|align=left|
|align=left|
|- align=center
|Win
|align=center|21–1–1||align=left| Michele Poddighe
|
|
|
|align=left|
|align=left|
|- align=center
|Draw
|align=center|20–1–1||align=left| Danny Porter
|
|
|
|align=left|
|align=left|
|- align=center
|Win
|align=center|20–1||align=left| James Drummond
|
|
|
|align=left|
|align=left|
|- align=center
|Win
|align=center|19–1||align=left| Danny Porter
|
|
|
|align=left|
|align=left|
|- align=center
|Win
|align=center|18–1||align=left| Joe Kelly
|
|
|
|align=left|
|align=left|
|- align=center
|Win
|align=center|17–1||align=left| Roberto Ledesma
|
|
|
|align=left|
|align=left|
|- align=center
|Loss
|align=center|16–1||align=left| Pat Clinton
|
|
|
|align=left|
|align=left|
|- align=center
|Win
|align=center|16–0||align=left| Roberto Ledesma
|
|
|
|align=left|
|align=left|
|- align=center
|Win
|align=center|15–0||align=left| Oscar Dante Reynoso
|
|
|
|align=left|
|align=left|
|- align=center
|Win
|align=center|14–0||align=left| John Vasquez
|
|
|
|align=left|
|align=left|
|- align=center
|Win
|align=center|13–0||align=left| Carmelo Fernandez
|
|
|
|align=left|
|align=left|
|- align=center
|Win
|align=center|12–0||align=left| Julio Osorio
|
|
|
|align=left|
|align=left|
|- align=center
|Win
|align=center|11–0||align=left| Gordon Shaw
|
|
|
|align=left|
|align=left|
|- align=center
|Win
|align=center|10–0||align=left| Alberto Cantu
|
|
|
|align=left|
|align=left|
|- align=center
|Win
|align=center|9–0||align=left| Jaime Olvera
|
|
|
|align=left|
|align=left|
|- align=center
|Win
|align=center|8–0||align=left| Juan Camero
|
|
|
|align=left|
|align=left|
|- align=center
|Win
|align=center|7–0||align=left| Fethi Touati
|
|
|
|align=left|
|align=left|
|- align=center
|Win
|align=center|6–0||align=left| Fethi Touati
|
|
|
|align=left|
|align=left|
|- align=center
|Win
|align=center|5–0||align=left| Tony Smith
|
|
|
|align=left|
|align=left|
|- align=center
|Win
|align=center|4–0||align=left| David Afan Jones
|
|
|
|align=left|
|align=left|
|- align=center
|Win
|align=center|3–0||align=left| Jose Juarez
|
|
|
|align=left|
|align=left|
|- align=center
|Win
|align=center|2–0||align=left| Cecilio Ramirez
|
|
|
|align=left|
|align=left|
|- align=center
|Win
|align=center|1–0|| align=left| Mohamed ben Ali Saidi
|
|
|
|align=left|
|align=left|

Personal life
Hailing from Cagliari, Fanni is the twelfth among thirteen siblings. His father was a fisherman while his mother stayed at home.

After retiring for good in 2003, he settled in the Is Mirrionis district of Cagliari with his wife and three kids, and has spent most of his time volunteering.

His youngest, Maurizio Fanni, trains to become a boxer like his father. He previously played football with teams such as Kolbe and Gigi Riva but plans to abandon the sport to compete in boxing.

See also
 List of European Boxing Union flyweight champions

References

External links
 
 Profile on iscali.it (in Italian)

Living people
1964 births
Italian male boxers
Flyweight boxers
Light-flyweight boxers
European Boxing Union champions
Sportspeople from Cagliari